Muslim Musa (born 15 January 1997) is an Afghan cricketer. He made his List A debut for Amo Region in the 2017 Ghazi Amanullah Khan Regional One Day Tournament on 10 August 2017. Before his List A debut, he was part of Afghanistan's squad for the 2016 Under-19 Cricket World Cup.

He made his Twenty20 debut for Band-e-Amir Dragons in the 2017 Shpageeza Cricket League on 12 September 2017. He made his first-class debut for Speen Ghar Region in the 2017–18 Ahmad Shah Abdali 4-day Tournament on 20 October 2017.

In September 2018, he was named in Kabul's squad in the first edition of the Afghanistan Premier League tournament.

References

External links
 

1997 births
Living people
Afghan cricketers
Amo Sharks cricketers
Kabul Zwanan cricketers
Spin Ghar Tigers cricketers
People from Nangarhar Province